The GoldenPass Express is a luxury railway service that operates between Montreux, on Lake Geneva, and Interlaken, in the Bernese Oberland, in Switzerland. The train is owned and operated jointly by the Montreux Oberland Bernois Railway (MOB) and BLS AG (BLS). As such, it uses the MOB's  gauge line between Montreux and Zweisimmen. In , the train cars change gauges in order to operate on BLS'  gauge lines from Zweisimmen to Spiez and then from Spiez to Interlaken. The automated gauge conversion, which adjusts both the track gauge and the height of the car body (to account for differences in platform heights), is believed to the first of its kind in the world.

Route 
Montreux is the terminus of the Montreux Oberland Bernois Railway's  gauge Montreux–Lenk im Simmental railway line and is shared with the  gauge Simplon line of Swiss Federal Railways. The train then climbs into the Bernese Alps, facing a maximum grade of  before arriving at the first intermediate stop of Montbovon,  and 48 minutes from Montreux.

From Montbovon the train continues through the Alps, following the course of the river Saane/Sarine to Château-d'Œx and Gstaad, the latter a famous holiday destination.

History 
The GoldenPass Express began operation on 11 December 2022, the date of the timetable change, with a single daily round-trip between Montreux and Interlaken. The two operators MOB and BLS plan to increase the frequency to four round-trips on 11 June 2023. This gradual increase is to match the lower demand caused by the global pandemic.

References

External links 
 
 

Railway services in Switzerland
Railway services introduced in 2022